Emmy Verhey (born 13 March 1949, in Amsterdam) is a Dutch violinist.

Biography

Verhey received her first violin lesson from her father when she was seven. Within a year, she played the Violin Concerto in A minor and the Concerto for Two Violins by Johann Sebastian Bach. Recognized as a child prodigy, she went to study at age 8 with the Austrian-born violin teacher Oskar Back. Later she studied with Herman Krebbers, Bela Dekany, Wolfgang Schneiderhan in Lucerne and David Oistrakh in Moscow.

At the age of 17, she was the youngest prize winning finalist at the 1966 International Tchaikovsky Competition in Moscow. A week later Verhey graduated from the Amsterdam Conservatory. The public interest for her examination was so huge that it had to take place at the Concertgebouw.

Verhey has played with eminent conductors such as Mariss Jansons, Riccardo Chailly, Bernard Haitink, Hans Vonk, Ed Spanjaard, Edo de Waart, Neville Marriner, Klaus Tennstedt, Jean Fournet and with fellow violinists Yehudi Menuhin, David Oistrakh and Igor Oistrakh. She has also played with soloists such as Youri Egorov, Janos Starker, Mischa Maisky and Maria João Pires. She has performed in Europe and in many other parts of the world such as the United States, Israel, South Korea and Japan. She is known for her solid technique and her warm and rich tone. Her repertoire spans all the range from early to contemporary music.

Verhey taught the violin at Utrecht's Conservatory from 1983 to 2002. In 1991 she co-founded the Camerata Antonio Lucio, a string ensemble whose repertoire includes works from the 18th to the 21st century.  Since 2006 the annual three-day Emmy Verhey Festival is held in Verhey's hometown Zaltbommel.

In the presence of Queen Beatrix of the Netherlands, Verhey celebrated her golden jubilee with a concert at the Nieuwe Kerk in The Hague on 20 May 2012.  In August 2014, she announced her intention to retire from performance after the summer of 2015. On 29 November 2015 Verhey played her farewell concert in Amsterdam.

Verhey has made over 55 recordings which include works by J.S. Bach, Beethoven, Brahms, Alphons Diepenbrock, Dvořák, Felix Mendelssohn, Mozart, Schubert, and Tchaikovsky, among others.

Instruments
In the late seventies Verhey acquired the 'Earl Spencer', a Stradivarius from 1723 which she played until she acquired a violin by Andrea Guarneri from 1676 in the late nineties.

In the year 2000 Emmy Verhey commissioned a copy of her Andrea Guarneri, made by the Dutch violinmaker Lambert Houniet. The instrument was completed in 2001 and owned by Verhey until her retirement from the concert stage.

Awards and distinctions
In 1966 she was the youngest prize winning finalist in the prestigious International Tchaikovsky Competition in Moscow and landed her first recording contract. In 1967 she won the National Oskar Back Violin Competition in Amsterdam. In 1971 she won the Tromp International Music Competition in Eindhoven.

In 2001 Verhey was appointed Ridder in de Orde van de Nederlandse Leeuw, the highest civil order in the Netherlands.
In 2012 she received the Andreaspenning from the City of Amsterdam. In 2009 she received the Gemeentepenning from the City of Zaltbommel who also created her 'honorary citizen.'

References

External links

  
 Official site of the Emmy Verhey Festival 
 Emmy Verhey page at Arkivmusic

1949 births
Living people
Dutch classical violinists
Musicians from Amsterdam
Knights of the Order of the Netherlands Lion
Women classical violinists
21st-century classical violinists
21st-century women musicians